

Champions, runners-up, and locations

* Vacated by NCAA.† Overtime game. Multiple †'s indicate number of overtimes.

All-time coaching records

Tournament Game Wins

Final Four appearances by coach
* Vacated by NCAA.

Multiple championship coaches
* Vacated by NCAA.

All-time team records

NCAA Championships

* Does not include appearances vacated by NCAA

NCAA Championship Game appearances
* Appearances vacated by NCAA not included

NCAA Tournament Final Four appearances

* Appearances vacated by NCAA not included

Consecutive NCAA Tournament Final Four appearances

NCAA Tournament appearances
* NCAA vacated 2–1 tournament record (1988)^ NCAA vacated 5–2 tournament record (1980, 1999)

† NCAA vacated 4–4 tournament record (2005–06, 2011–12), but confirmed Syracuse can claim tournament appearances.†† NCAA vacated 15–3 tournament record (2012–15)††† NCAA vacated 4–1 tournament record (1971)

Consecutive NCAA Tournament appearances

Teams in bold denote an active streak as of the 2023 tournament

* NCAA vacated 1999 and 2008 appearances^ NCAA vacated 1980 appearance

NCAA Tournament victories

* Denotes vacated records not included
 Margin of 10 points: Oregon (1939), Kentucky (1949), San Francisco (1956), Ohio State (1960), UCLA (1967, 1970, 1973), Michigan State (1979, 2000), Indiana (1981), Duke (2001), North Carolina (2009), and Villanova (2018) are teams to win every game in the tournament by 10 points or more on their way to a championship.

Individual single-game records
Points
61, Austin Carr, Notre Dame vs. Ohio, 1970
Field Goals
25, Austin Carr, Notre Dame vs. Ohio, 1970
Field Goal Attempts
44, Austin Carr, Notre Dame vs. Ohio, 1970
Three-point Field Goals
11, Jeff Fryer, Loyola Marymount vs. Michigan, 1990
Three-point Field Goal Attempts
22, Jeff Fryer, Loyola Marymount vs. Arkansas, 1989
Free Throws Made
23, Bob Carney, Bradley vs. Colorado, 1954
23, Travis Mays, Texas vs. Georgia, 1990
Free Throws Attempted
27, Travis Mays, Texas vs. Georgia, 1990
27, David Robinson, Navy vs. Syracuse, 1986
Rebounds
34, Fred Cohen, Temple vs. Connecticut, 1956
Assists
18, Mark Wade, UNLV vs. Indiana, 1987
Blocked Shots
11, Shaquille O'Neal, LSU vs. BYU, 1992
Steals
8, Ty Lawson, North Carolina vs. Michigan State, 2009
8, Russ Smith, Louisville vs. North Carolina A&T, 2013
8, JD Notae, Arkansas vs. New Mexico State, 2022
Triple-doubles (see Final Four records section for other tournament triple-doubles)
Assists were not recorded nationally by the NCAA until the 1984–85 season, and steals and blocks were not officially added as NCAA statistics until the 1986–87 season. As a result, the NCAA only officially recognizes tournament triple-doubles recorded from 1987 onward.
Gary Grant, Michigan — 24 points, 10 rebounds, 10 assists vs. North Carolina, East Regional second round, March 14, 1987
Shaquille O'Neal, LSU — 26 points, 13 rebounds, 11 blocks vs. BYU, West Regional first round, March 19, 1992
David Cain, St. John's — 12 points, 11 rebounds, 11 assists vs. Texas Tech, East Regional first round, March 18, 1993
Andre Miller, Utah — 18 points, 14 rebounds, 13 assists vs. Arizona, West Regional Final, March 21, 1998
Dwyane Wade, Marquette — 29 points, 11 rebounds, 11 assists vs. Kentucky, Midwest Regional Final, March 29, 2003
Cole Aldrich, Kansas — 13 points, 20 rebounds, 10 blocks vs. Dayton, Midwest Regional Second Round, March 22, 2009
Draymond Green, Michigan State — 23 points, 11 rebounds, 10 assists vs. UCLA, Southeast Regional Second Round, March 18, 2011
Draymond Green, Michigan State — 24 points, 12 rebounds, 10 assists vs. LIU–Brooklyn, West Regional Second Round, March 16, 2012
Ja Morant, Murray State - 17 points, 11 rebounds, 16 assists vs. Marquette, West Regional First Round, March 21, 2019

Team single-game records

All tournament games
Most total points scored, one tournament 
571, UNLV, 1990
Most combined points
264, Loyola Marymount vs. Michigan, 1990
Most points by a single team
149, Loyola Marymount vs. Michigan, 1990
Fewest points for a single team
20, North Carolina vs. Pittsburgh, 1941
Most Field Goals Made
52, Iowa vs. Notre Dame, 1970
Field Goals Attempted
112, Marshall vs. Southwestern Louisiana, 1972
Three-point Field Goals
26, Kansas vs. Villanova, 2022
Three-point Field Goal Attempts
59, Purdue Boilermakers vs. Virginia Cavaliers, 2019
Free Throws Made
43, Arizona vs. Illinois, 2001
Free Throws Attempted
56, Arizona vs. Illinois, 2001
Rebounds
86, Notre Dame vs. Tennessee Tech, 1958
Assists
36, North Carolina vs. Loyola Marymount, 1988
Blocked Shots
15, Kentucky vs. Stony Brook, 2016
Steals
20, Louisville vs. North Carolina A&T, 2013
Combined Steals
35, UCLA vs. Kansas, 2007

National Championship game
 Most combined points
182, Kentucky vs. Duke, 1978
 Most points by a single team
103, UNLV vs. Duke, 1990
Largest margin at half time
21, North Carolina vs. Michigan State, 2009
Largest score at half time
55, North Carolina vs. Michigan State, 2009
Largest margin of victory
30, UNLV vs. Duke, 1990

Final Four records
Final Four Single Game – Individual
 Points
58, Bill Bradley, Princeton vs. Wichita St., N3rd, 3-20-1965
 Field Goals Made
22, Bill Bradley, Princeton vs. Wichita St., N3rd, 3-20-1965
 Field Goals Attempted
42, Lennie Rosenbluth, North Carolina vs. Michigan St., NSF, 3-22-1957
 Three-Point Field Goals
10, Freddie Banks, UNLV vs. Indiana, NSF, 3-28-1987
 Rebounds
27, Bill Russell, San Francisco vs. Iowa, CH, 3-23-1956
 Assists
18, Mark Wade, UNLV vs. Indiana, NSF, 3-28-1987
 Blocks
7, Jeff Withey, Kansas vs. Ohio State, NSF, 3-31-2012
 Free Throws Attempted
18, Ty Lawson, North Carolina vs. Michigan State, CH, 4-6-2009
 Steals
8, Ty Lawson, North Carolina vs. Michigan State, CH, 4-6-2009
 Final Four Triple-Doubles
The NCAA recognizes these achievements as unofficial triple-doubles. As noted earlier, assists, steals, and blocks were not kept on a national basis until well into the 1980s; the current array of national statistics did not fully take shape until the 1986–87 season.
B.H. Born, Kansas vs. Indiana, CH, 3-18-1953: 26 pts., 15 rebs. & 13 blocked shots.
Oscar Robertson, Cincinnati vs. Louisville, N3rd, 3-21-1959: 39 pts., 17 rebs. & 10 asts.
Magic Johnson, Michigan St. vs. Pennsylvania, NSF, 3-24-1979: 29 pts., 10 rebs. & 10 asts.
Largest margin of victory: 44, Villanova vs. Oklahoma, 4-2-2016

Key to initials: NSF- National Semi-Final; N3rd – National Third-Place Game (Discontinued after 1981); CH – Championship Game.

References

College sports records and statistics in the United States

External links

 NCAA Tournament Records Book PDF

NCAA Division I men's basketball tournament